The Pearl Street Mall (also referred to as Pearl Street, or Downtown Boulder) is a four-block pedestrian mall in Boulder, Colorado.  The pedestrian area stretches from 11th Street to 15th Street along Pearl Street and is home to a number of businesses and restaurants as well as the Boulder County Courthouse.

About

The Pearl Street Mall is a popular destination for tourists visiting Boulder and for students attending the nearby University of Colorado Boulder.  The mall hosts a blend of locally owned businesses and national chain stores and restaurants.  It is also home to much of Boulder's nightlife.  During the summer months, Pearl Street Mall is the stage for a number of street performers, including musicians.

The Pearl Street Mall is filled with public art, including numerous fountains and sculptures as well as a sandbox for children, a stylized map of Boulder County and a number of small gardens which are planted with a variety of flowers and trees, most notably tulips in the spring.

The Mall is at the heart of downtown Boulder, in the western part of present-day Boulder.  The area is an historic district and many of the buildings are among the oldest in Boulder.  The Boulder County Courthouse is located in the 1300 block on the north side of the mall.  Although the courthouse no longer houses the actual courts for Boulder County, it remains the seat of county government.

History

As a Planning Board member, Carl A. Worthington began working on the project in 1966 in an attempt to revitalize Boulder's downtown. In 1973 he prepared a master plan which was approved by an 86% majority. The Pearl Street Mall was constructed between June 1976 and August 1977 and was officially dedicated on August 6, 1977.  The design team consisted of three firms: CommArts, Inc. (Boulder), Everett Ziegel Associates (Boulder), and Watertown, Massachusetts-based Sasaki Associates.

Scenes from the movie Catch and Release, which was set in Boulder, were filmed on the Pearl Street Mall in July 2005.

In the TV series Mork & Mindy, the New York Deli operated by Remo and Jean DaVinci was located at 1117 Pearl Street. The actual deli of the same name and location closed in June 1999.

References

External links
 Downtown Boulder

Culture of Boulder, Colorado
Streets in Colorado
Pedestrian malls in the United States
Tourist attractions in Boulder, Colorado
Downtown Boulder Historic District